HMS Landrail was a Cuckoo-class schooner built by Thomas Sutton at Ringmore, Teignmouth. Like all her class she carried four 12-pounder carronades and had a crew of 20. She had a relatively uneventful career during the Napoleonic Wars and the War of 1812 until 1814 when she was taken in a notable action, and then retaken. She was sold in approximately 1818.

Service
The first mention of her service occurred in 1812 when she operated in the Channel under the command of Lieutenant John Hill.On the afternoon of 18 December 1812 Landrail chased the French 40-gun frigate Gloire in company with the 18-gun ship-sloop , the 12-gun schooner Pickle and the 12-gun brig-sloop . Albacore and Pickle had found themselves close to the much larger French ship off The Lizard at daybreak in light winds. In the exchange of fire Albacore suffered one man killed and six or seven wounded before she pulled back. Borer and Landrail closed to assist, but Gloire managed to outrun her pursuers. In the engagement Landrail did not actually fire her guns. As James put it, "for the Landrail to have fired her 12-pounders would have been a farce."

In 1813 Landrail performed a number of duties, including accompanying a convoy to the Baltic and carrying dispatches to Heligoland. On 17 June Landrail captured the Danish sloop Resolutionen, C. P. Albech, Master. Then some months later, on 13 November, she captured the Danish vessel Hoffnung.

On 6 January 1814 Landrail arrived at the Isles of Scilly where she was put under quarantine. She brought with her the ship Duck, bound from Newfoundland to Portugal, which also carried the crews of a number of merchant vessels that two French frigates had captured. On 22 March she arrived at Falmouth from Bordeaux with a French officer with dispatches. On 21 June Lieutenant Robert Daniel Lancaster took command.

Capture and recapture
On 12 July Landrail was in the Channel, on her way to Gibraltar with dispatches when she encountered the American privateer Syren under Captain J.D. Daniels. Syren carried seven cannons, one long 12 on a travelling (pivoting) carriage, four long 6-pounders and two 18-pounder carronades, and a crew of 50 men. This gave her a broadside of 42 pounds, compared to Landrail s 24 pounds, and a crew two and a half times larger.

Syren had had a successful cruise, capturing six British vessels, and she gave chase. Lancaster attempted to escape, keeping up a running fight of a little over an hour, and a close action of 40 minutes. During the action, one of Landrails engaged carronades was disabled. She turned, so as to be able to use the two on her other broadside. Landrail and Syren ended up close together with the muzzles of their guns touching. Eventually Landrail, out of small-arms ammunition, with the breechings of her carronades carried away, struck. She had suffered five, or seven men wounded.  Her sails were riddled with shot-holes and her hull had taken many hits.   Syren had three men killed and 15 wounded. Some American reports give the Syren’s losses as only three men wounded.
                                                 
On 28 August, the Cruizer-class brig-sloop , under the command of Lieutenant Richard Crawford (acting Commander), recaptured Landrail while she was on her way to the United States. Wasp took Landrail into Halifax.

However, the officers and crew of Landrail remained in captivity in the US.

Syren returned to the United States but as she approached the Delaware River the British blockading ships gave chase. Her crew set her on fire before making their escape.

In late 1814 or early 1815, while on the Halifax station under Lieutenant (Gustavus) Robert Rochfort, Landrail successfully repulsed a force of five American privateers. The American vessels were the 10-gun Charles Stewart of Boston, the 4-gun Cumberland of Portland, the 4-gun Fame of Thomastown, the sloop Jefferson of Salem, and a schooner, name and armament unknown. Landrail was on her way to join a convoy to Castine, Maine, then in British possession. The fight lasted some two hours though there is no report of casualties on Landrail. Reportedly, the American privateers did suffer a number of killed and wounded.

Fate
Landrail was paid off October 1816. She was sold in or about 1818.

Postscript
Landrail’s flag went to the United States Naval Academy at Annapolis where it hangs with a number of other captured flags.

Coincidence
On 11 July 1896, almost exactly 92 years after the first Landrails capture by Syren, the torpedo gunboat  rammed and sank the clipper merchant ship Siren. Siren was a large four-masted vessel carrying a cargo of wool and tallow from Sydney to Britain. The accident occurred on a clear night, some thirty miles from Portland Bill. There were no lives lost on either vessel and Landrail herself suffered trifling damage. The owners of Siren put their loss at £86,529.

Notes

Citations

References
Allen, Joseph (1846) The New Navy List and General Records of the Services of Officers of the Royal Navy and Royal Marines. (London: Parker, Furnival, and Parker, Military Library, Whitehall).
 
 
James, William (1817) A full and correct account of the chief naval occurrences of the late war between Great Britain and the United States of America. (London: T. Egerton).

 
Owen, Douglas (1914) Ocean Trade and Shipping. (Cambridge: Cambridge University).
Snider, G.H.J. (1928) Under the Red Jack: Privateers of the Maritime Provinces of Canada in the War of 1812. (London: Martin Hopkinson & Co.).
 
Washburn, Harold Connett (United States Naval Academy; 1913) Illustrated case inscriptions from the official catalogue of the trophy flags of the United States Navy. (Baltimore, Md.: The Lord Baltimore Press).

1806 ships
Cuckoo-class schooners
Captured ships
War of 1812 ships of the United Kingdom
Ships built in Devon